Quenza is a commune in the department of Corse-du-Sud, island and collectivity of Corsica, France.

Geography

Climate

Quenza has a hot-summer Mediterranean climate (Köppen climate classification Csa) closely bordering on a warm-summer Mediterranean climate (Csb).

Population

See also
Communes of the Corse-du-Sud department
Aiguilles de Bavella

References

Communes of Corse-du-Sud
Corse-du-Sud communes articles needing translation from French Wikipedia